Viens voir les comédiens is a television show on the Canadian French-language arts and culture television network ARTV.

Description
The show is directly based on the format used in similar television programs: the American Inside the Actors Studio and the French Les feux de la rampe, in that each episode features a cinema or theatre actor answering questions from the host, René Homier-Roy, and, at the end of the show, from members of the audience.

Title
The show's title is taken from a Charles Aznavour song and means "Come see the actors".

See also
List of Quebec television series
Television of Quebec
Cinema of Quebec
Culture of Quebec

External links
Official site 

Television shows filmed in Quebec
2000s Canadian television talk shows